Elkington Molivakarua (born 3 March 1993) is a Ni-Vanuatu international footballer who plays for Port Vila Football League side Erakor Golden Star.

International career
Molivakarua made his senior international debut on 23 November 2017 in a 1-0 friendly defeat to Estonia. He scored his first senior international goal on 12 December 2017, netting in the 60th minute of a 10-0 victory over Tuvalu at the 2017 Pacific Mini Games.

Career statistics

Club

Notes

International

International goals
Scores and results list Vanuatu's goal tally first.

References

1993 births
Living people
Vanuatuan footballers
Vanuatu international footballers
Association football forwards
Erakor Golden Star F.C. players